Ann Lislegaard (born 1962 in Norway) is a contemporary artist living and working in Copenhagen, Denmark and New York City, US. She is known for her 3D film animations and sound-light installations often departing from ideas found in science fiction. She finds in Science fiction an alternative approach to language, narration, gender roles and concepts of the future.

Solo exhibitions selected
2015
 Paraspace, Tel Aviv Museum of Art, Tel Aviv, Israel
2014
 Oracles, Owls…some animals never sleep, Murray Guy Gallery, New York, NY, US
2012
 Speaking in Tongues, Paul Andriesse, Amsterdam, The Netherlands
2011
 Time Machine, Murray Guy Gallery, New York, NY, US
2010
 Tapping of the Fox Sisters, Marabouparken – Contemporary Art Center, Sundbyberg/Stockholm, Sweden
2009
 What if, MOCAD – Museum of Contemporary Art Detroit, Detroit, MI, US
 2062, The Henry Art Museum, Seattle, WA, US
 Ann Lislegaard (solo with Ultra Red, Thomas Bayrle), Raven Row, London, UK
2008
 Science Fiction, Galerie Paul Andriesse, Amsterdam, The Netherlands
 Left Hand of Darkness, Murray Guy Gallery, New York, NY, US
2007
 Science Fiction and Other Worlds, Astrup Fearnley Museum of Modern Art, Oslo, Norway
 The Crystal World, X-rummet, Statens Museum for Kunst, Copenhagen, Denmark*
 Art–Unlimited, Ann Lislegaard, Paul Andriesse Gallerie, Basel, Switzerland
2006
 Ann Lislegaard, NCA – Nichido Contemporary Art, Tokyo, Japan
 Ann Lislegaard, Galerie Paul Andriesse, Amsterdam, The Netherlands
 Ann Lislegaard, Esbjerg Kunstmuseum, Esbjerg, Denmark
2005
 51st Venice Biennale, Danish Pavilion (with Peter Land, Joachim Koester, Gitte Villesen, Eva Koch), Venice, Italy
 Bellona, Murray Guy Gallery, New York, NY, US
 Kunstpassagen, Astrup Fearnly Museet, Oslo, Norway
2004
 Sonic Construction, Aldrich Museum of Contemporary Art, Rigdefield, CT, US
2003
 Ann Lislegaard, Galleria Raucci e Santamaria, Naples, Italy
 Ann Lislegaard, Murray Guy Gallery, New York, NY, US
 Art-Unlimited, Ann Lislegaard, Paul Andriesse Gallerie, Basel Art fair, Basel, Switzerland
2002
 Ann Lislegaard, Paul Andriesse Gallerie, Amsterdam, The Netherlands
 Ann Lislegaard, Esbjerg Kunstmuseum, Esbjerg, Denmark
 Eyes Wide Open, Det Nationale Fotomuseum, Diamanten, Copenhagen, Denmark
 The Space Between Us, Dundee Contemporary Arts, Dundee, Scotland
 Empty, the room seems large to me, Arthouse, Dublin, Ireland
2001
 Slowly Spinning, Kunstnernes Hus, Oslo, Norway*
2000
 Corner Piece – The Space Between Us, Galleria Raucci e Santamaria, Naples, Italy
 Lige med et blev alt anderledes, The Children's Reading Room, Louisiana Museum of Modern Art, Denmark
 I-You-Later-There, Galleri Tommy Lund, Copenhagen, Denmark
 Ann Lislegaard, Huis A/D Werf, Utrecht, The Netherlands
 Ann Lislegaard, Kunstpanorama, Luzern, Switzerland
1999
 Double Room, Moderna Museet Project, Stockholm, Sweden
 Transparent Walls, Galerie Paul Andriesse, Amsterdam, the Netherlands
1998
 Bicycle Thieves, Crown Gallery, Chicago, IL, US
1997
 Blind Date (with Olaf Nicolai), Luthringer Strasse, Munich, Germany
 Nothing But Space, Galleri Tommy Lund, Odense, Denmark
1995 
 Ann Lislegaard, Schaper Sundberg Galleri, Stockholm, Sweden
 Ann Lislegaard, Galleri Tommy Lund, Odense, Denmark
 Ann Lislegaard, LXX, Aarhus, Denmark
 Ann Lislegaard, Galleri Struds, Oslo, Norway
1994
 Liberty Bells, Lageret, Kunstforeningen Gl. Strand, Copenhagen, Denmark
1992
 A Touch of Fear, Galleri Basilisk, Copenhagen, Denmark

Recent group exhibitions (selected)
2015
 PARASOPHIA, Kyoto International Festival of Contemporary Culture, Kyoto, Japan*
 Beam me up!, Kristianstads Konsthall, Kristianstad, Sweden
 15 favoritter fra samlingen, KØS – Museum of Art in Public Spaces, Køge, Denmark
 I hear your voice reflected in a glass and it sounds like it is inside of me, curated by Emily Wardill in conversation with Jesi Khadivi, Carlier Gebauer, Berlin, Germany
 Voyage to the Virtuel, Scandinavia House, New York, NY, US
 Kvartet, Esbjerg Kunstmuseum, Esbjerg, Denmark
 Kvinder, Horsens Kunstmuseum, Horsens, Denmark
2014
 You Imagine What You Desire, 19th Biennale of Sydney, Sydney, Australia
 L’avenir, La Biennale de Montréal 2014, Montreal, Canada
 Magnus, Scènes de l'imaginaire automate, Mamco, Génève, Switzerland
 Re:visited, Latvian Center of Contemporary Art, Riga 2014 – European Culture Capital, Riga, Latvia
2013
 12e Biennale de Lyon, Musée d’Art Contemporain, Lyon, France
 Seismology, Palais De Tokyo, Paris, France
 Approximately Infinite Universe, MCASD – Museum of Contemporary Art, San Diego, CA, US
 Malmö Art Museum @ Malmö Konsthall, Malmö Konsthall, Malmö, Sweden
 The Beginning Is Always Today (Bob Smith projects), SKMU – Sørlandets Kunstmuseum, Kristiansand, Norway
 Et rum med udsigt (Bob Smith projects), Rønnebæksholm, Næstved, Denmark
 24 Spaces A Cacophony, Malmø Konsthall, Sweden
 Distinguished from the melee of user comments and structurally misogynist chat rooms harbouring rapid-fire trolls, Skt. Gertruds, Malmø, Sweden
 Contemporary #2, Museet for Samtidskunst, Roskilde, Denmark
2012
 Narrative Arc, GUAG – Griffith University Art Gallery, Queensland College of Art, Brisbane, Australia
 Theater of the World, Museum of Old and New Art, Berriedale, Tasmania
 Beyond Good and Evil, Den Frie, The Copenhagen Art Festival, Copenhagen, Denmark
 Dexter, Bang, Sinister, Research Program, Charlottenborg Kunsthal, Copenhagen, Denmark
 Overgaden at The Armory Show, Armory, New York, NY, US
2011
 Imagine Being Here Now, The 6th Momentum Biennial, Moss, Norway
 The Smithson Effect, Utah Museum of Fine Arts, University of Utah, UT, US
 The Man Without Qualities | L’uomo senza qualita, Teatro Margherita, Bari, Italy
 Assim é, se lhe parece, Museu da Imagem e do Som, Paço das Artes, São Paulo, Brazil
 VideoSpace, Astrup Fearnley Collection, Oslo, Norway
 The Passenger, Gallerie Paul Andriesse, Amsterdam, the Netherlands
 Contemporary #1, Museet for Samtidskunst, Roskilde, Denmark
2010 
 Power Games, Ludwig Museum - Museum of Contemporary Art, Budapest, Hungary
 Busan Biennale, Busan Museum of Art, Busan, Korea
 Wall of Sound, Te Tuhi Centre for the Arts, Auckland, New Zealand
 Polis, Polis, Potatismos - Utställning om ett brott, Malmö Konsthall, Malmö, Sweden
 Handlinger – Performance og lydkunst, Museet for Samtidskunst, Roskilde, Demark
 Pastiche 2010, VAK, Jyderup, Denmark
 Connexions, Esbjerg Kunstmuseum, Esbjerg, Denmark
2009 
 Automatic Cities, Museum of Contemporary Art San Diego, San Diego, US
 Euphoria Left the Room, Scion, Los Angeles, CA, US
 Entr'acte, Kukje Gallery, Seoul, Korea
 Dream, Statens Museum for Kunst, Copenhagen, DK
 Rotating Views – Astrup Fearnley Collection, Astrup Fearnly Museum of Modern Art, Oslo, Norway
 Nyerhvervelser 2007-2008, Louisiana Museum of Modern Art, Denmark
 Retreat, UNStudio, Fort Aspen, the Netherlands
 Das Gespinst, Museum Abteiberg, Mönchengladbach, Germany
 Until the End of the World, AMP, Athens, Greece
 Helsingborg og Malmö – 22 Major Works From the Collection of Malmö Art Museum, Dunkers Kulturhus, Helsingborg, Sweden
 In the search of the Unknown, Montevideo, Amsterdam, the Netherlands
 Cut & Paste, Susanne Ottesen Galleri, Copenhagen, Denmark
2008
 The Cinematic or Moving Images Expanded: Artists’ Film and Video Showcase 2008, Insa Art Space Seoul, Korea
 Modern Ruin, Queensland Art Gallery - Gallery of Modern Art, Brisbane, Australia
 The Future as Disruption, The Kitchen, New York, NY, US
 JG Ballard. An Autopsy of the New Millennium, CCCB - Centre de Cultura Contemporània de Barcelona, Spain
 Reality Check, Statens Museum for Kunst, Copenhagen, Denmark
 U-Turn Quadrennial for Contemporary Art, Carlsberg Garden, Copenhagen, Denmark
 Re-Enactments, DHC/ART (Foundation For Contemporary Art), Montréal, Canada
 The Light Project, Pulitzer Arts Foundation, St. Louis, MO, US
 In the Space of Elsewhere, Stanley Picker Gallery, Kingston University, London, UK
 The Map is not the Territory, Esbjerg Kunstmuseum, Esbjerg, Denmark
 Danskjävlar - a Swedish Declaration of Love, Kunsthal Charlottenborg, Copenhagen, Denmark
 Auricula, Krabbesholm Højskole, Denmark
 AUX, Planetariet, Copenhagen, Denmark
2007
 Off Screen, Montevideo, Amsterdam, the Netherlands
 Animated Painting, San Diego Museum of Art, San Diego, CA, US, travelling to: 2009 Faulconer Gallery, Grinnell College, Grinnell, IA, US; 2009 El Cubo at Centro Cultural Tijuana, Mexico
 Mind the Gap, Fabrikken, Copenhagen, Denmark
 V-effekten, Kunsthal Nikolaj, Copenhagen, Denmark
 space.gaze.desire, Den Frie, Copenhagen, Denmark
 LARM - From Myth Cavity to Laptop, Moderna Museet, Stockholm, Sweden
2006
 Como viver junto (How to live together), 27th Bienal de São Paulo, São Paulo, Brazil
 Contos Dixitais/Digital Tales, CGAC, Santiago de Compostella, Spain
 Realitātes arheoloģija (Archaeology of Reality), Andrejsala, Riga, Vilnius
 A BRIGHTER DAY, James Cohan Gallery, New York, NY, US
 News: Recent Acquisitions in Contemporary Art, The Israel Museum, Jerusalem, Israel
 El Espacio Interior, Exhibition Room Alcalá 31, Madrid, Spain
 Mission: Reality, Museet for Samtidskunst, Roskilde, Denmark
 Places where Immaterials can be Obtained, Galerie Paul Andriesse, Amsterdam, the Netherlands
 Det Reale og Det Fantastiske, Den Frie, Copenhagen, Denmark
 Other Voices, Other Rooms, Contemporary Art from the Frac Collection, The Israel Museum, Jerusalem, Israel
2005
 Ecstasy: In and About Altered States, MOCA – The Museum of Contemporary Art, Los Angeles, CA, US
 More than this – Negotiating Realities, Göteborgs International Biennial for Contemporary Art, Göteborg, Sweden

Recognition
Winning an Eckersberg Medal 2015

Commissions (selected)
 2014 111 White Plateaus, KØS - Museum of Art in Public Spaces, Køge, Denmark
 2009 Passage, Christies Gate, Moss, Norway

Collections (selected)
Louisiana Museum of Modern Art, Humlebæk, Denmark,
MONA, Tasmania, Australia,
The Solomon R. Guggenheim Museum, New York, NY, US,
Museet for Samtidskunst, Roskilde, Denmark,
Astrup Fearnley Museet for Moderne Kunst, Oslo, Norway,
Frac Languedoc-Roussillon, Montpellier, France,
The Israel Museum, Jerusalem, Israel,
Museo Nacional Centro de Arte Reina Sofía, Madrid, Spain,
MOCAD - Museum of Contemporary Art San Diego, San Diego, CA, US,
National Museum of Women in the Arts, Washington, DC, US,
Statens Museum for Kunst, Copenhagen, Denmark,
Esbjerg Kunstmuseum, Esbjerg, Denmark

Publications
 Spiral Book. Texts by Ann Lislegaard, Lars Bang Larsen, David Velasco, Donna J. Haraway, and Ursula K. Le Guin. Motto distribution

References

External links
 Artist's website
 Murray Guy Gallery
 McLean-Ferris, Laura. “Ann Lislegaard”, review, Frieze, March 2015
 Farago, Jason. "Ann Lislegaard", review, Artforum, 15 November 2014
 Searle, Adrian. “Electric Light Orchestra”, review, The Guardian, 25 January 2000

1962 births
Living people
Norwegian contemporary artists
Danish contemporary artists
Norwegian women artists
Danish women artists
20th-century Danish artists
20th-century Norwegian women artists
21st-century Danish artists
21st-century Norwegian women artists
20th-century Norwegian artists
21st-century Norwegian artists